Kanwaljit Singh  is an Indian actor who has performed in films as well as television serials. He has acted in Hindi and Punjabi films.

Personal life
He is married to Anuradha Patel, Ashok Kumar's granddaughter. They have two sons Sidharth and Aditya and a god-daughter, Mariam, living in the United States.

Filmography

Films

Television

References

External links 

 
 

Year of birth missing (living people)
Living people
20th-century Indian male actors
21st-century Indian male actors
Indian male film actors
Male actors in Hindi cinema
Indian male television actors
Film and Television Institute of India alumni
Male actors in Punjabi cinema
Place of birth missing (living people)